Fishtown may refer to:
Places
 Fishtown, Indiana, unincorporated community in Harrison County, Indiana
 Fishtown, Philadelphia, neighborhood in Philadelphia, Pennsylvania
 Leland Historic District (Leland, Michigan), historic district in Leland, Michigan; colloquially known as "Fishtown"
 Fishtown (art colony), informal artists' community, Skagit County, Washington
Art, entertainment, and media
 Fishtown, a comic book written by Kevin Colden

See also
 Fish Town, capital city of River Gee County, Liberia